Clostridium celatum is a Gram-positive and anaerobic bacterium from the genus Clostridium which has been isolated from human faeces.

References

Further reading
 
 

 

Bacteria described in 1974
celatum